The National Sports Delegation (DND) was a Spanish autonomous body, belonging to the Falange Española Tradicionalista party and the JONS, which existed during the Franco dictatorship and which had among its powers the direction of Spanish sports policy. It was dissolved in 1977 and replaced by the Higher Sports Council (CSD).

History 
The body was established by decree on 22 February 1941, and was in charge of the sports policies of the Franco regime. Francisco Franco appointed General José Moscardó as the first national sports delegate. In the post-war context, during the first years the delegation had few material resources at its disposal. In 1956, a new national delegate was appointed, José Antonio Elola-Olaso, and the organization adopted the new name of "National Delegation of Physical Education and Sports", and was attached to the General Secretary of the Movement. Under the direction of Elola-Olaso, the national delegation took a turn in its line of action, carrying out campaigns to promote sports and physical education. Starting in 1956, Spanish sport received an important institutional boost.

The arrival of the new national delegate meant a change in the sports training model under military guidelines that had prevailed until then, and its replacement by a new civil model supervised by the Falange organizations. In this sense, one of the most important measures carried out was the promulgation in 1961 of the Physical Education Law —also known as the Elola-Olaso Law, which considered “Physical and Sports Education as a public necessity that the State recognizes and guarantees as a right of all Spaniards. Under the support of said law, the National Institute of Physical Education (INEF) was established in 1967.

In 1970, a decree established the provincial delegations of Physical Education and Sports.

After Franco's death, and the dismantling of the institutions of the Franco regime, in April 1977 the body was dissolved. Months later, the Higher Sports Council (CSD) was established in its place, which assumed the role and functions previously carried out by the National Sports Delegation.

National delegates

References

Bibliography 

1941 establishments in Spain
Sport in Spain
Sports organizations established in 1941
Government agencies established in 1941
1977 disestablishments in Spain